Greece was represented by 15 athletes at the 1966 European Athletics Championships held in Budapest, Hungary.

Medals

References

 http://www.sansimera.gr/articles/804

1966
1966 in Greek sport
Nations at the 1966 European Athletics Championships